Joyce Hale née Joyce Luncher (born 19 June 1975) is a retired American Paralympic swimmer who competed at the 1996 Summer Paralympics where she set seven American records and four world records. She was born without her right forearm.

References

1975 births
Living people
Sportspeople from Pittsburgh
People from Cumberland, Maine
Paralympic swimmers of the United States
Swimmers at the 1996 Summer Paralympics
Medalists at the 1996 Summer Paralympics
Paralympic medalists in swimming
Paralympic gold medalists for the United States
Paralympic silver medalists for the United States
American female freestyle swimmers
American female medley swimmers
American female butterfly swimmers
American female breaststroke swimmers
S9-classified Paralympic swimmers
20th-century American women